WWRV (1330 AM) is a Spanish-language Christian music and teaching station, licensed to New York City. It is owned by Radio Visión Cristiana Management.

History
For years 1330 was WEVD, named after the Socialist Party leader Eugene V. Debs. However, the story of this frequency dates back to 1926, when WJBV signed on at a frequency of 640kc. WSOM, broadcasting from New York's Hotel Somerset, took over in early 1927 and beginning June 1, 1927 moved to 1220kc. In August 1927 the Socialist Party of America purchased WSOM which was transmitting from Woodhaven in the New York City borough of Queens as a means of reaching a mass audience with socialist ideas. Making use of the initials of recently deceased party leader Eugene Victor Debs in its call sign. The station was purchased with a $250,000 radio fund raised by the Socialist Party in its largest fundraising effort of the 1920s and was intended as spreading progressive ideas to a mass audience. A number of national trade unions and other institutions aided the Socialists in obtaining the station. Beginning in 1928, WEVD shared its frequency with WBBR (Watchtower Brooklyn Broadcasting Radio), owned by the Watchtower Bible and Tract Society, publishing arm of the religious group Jehovah's Witnesses. Late in 1929 WEVD was moved to a new frequency by the Federal Radio Commission, 1300 AM, and was able to boost its power somewhat. While the move had been sought by the Debs Memorial Radio Fund, which remained the legal entity owning the station, the change ultimately solved little. WEVD remained underpowered and forced to share its frequency with WBBR (later called WPOW) and WHAZ, the radio station of Rensselaer Polytechnic Institute in Troy, New York, which was on-air only on Monday evenings. Owing to the party's financial difficulties the station was taken over by the publishing association of the left wing Yiddish-language daily newspaper The Jewish Daily Forward in 1932 and it moved to 1330kc in 1941. From the time of the 1932 broadcasting agreement through the 1970s the Socialist and Yiddish-language WEVD continued to share its station frequency with the religious group, transmitting 86 hours per week while leaving Sundays and early mornings until 8:00 to WPOW, and Monday nights to WHAZ. WHAZ was sold to the owners of WPOW in 1973 and turned into a non-interfering, daytime-only station, with WPOW taking the old WHAZ Monday night hours.

In 1981 The Forward sold 1330 to Salem Communications, now known as the Salem Media Group, a large owner of religious radio stations. Salem renamed the station WNYM and made it a Christian formatted station from 6 AM to 4:30 PM while running foreign language religious shows after 4:30 PM.

In 1983 Salem leased the entire broadcast day except from 6 AM to 9 AM to Radio Visión. The station at that time shifted to its current Spanish Religious format. In 1984, WNYM bought out WPOW, the successor to WBBR, enabling it to broadcast full-time on 1330. In 1989 Salem bought 570 WMCA and sold WNYM to Radio Visión.  The Spanish religious format was expanded to broadcast all day, every day, and the station call sign was changed to WWRV to reflect the station's new identity.

WWRV studios are at 419 Broadway in Paterson, New Jersey and share transmitting towers with WNYM in North Hackensack, New Jersey.

In 2016 WWRV moved its transmitter facilities to a diplex with WZRC site in Ridgefield Park, NJ.

See also
 WEVD

References

External links 
FCC History Cards for WWRV

WRV